Halashi may refer to:
 Halashi, Karnataka, a village in India
 Halashi, Iran, a city in Iran
 Halashi, Ilam, a village in Ilam Province, Iran